8 O'Clock: Two Improvisations is an album by American saxophonist Roscoe Mitchell and vocalist Thomas Buckner which was recorded in 2000 and released on Mutable Music the following year.

Reception

In his review for AllMusic, François Couture states:

Track listing
All compositions by Roscoe Mitchell and Thomas Buckner
 "Improvisation 1: VPF" – 7:41
 "Improvisation 1: VSP" – 11:10
 "Improvisation 1: VS" – 8:38
 "Improvisation 1: VFPSA" – 17:18
 "Improvisation 2: VAP" – 12:57
 "Improvisation 2: VPA" – 7:38

Personnel
Roscoe Mitchell - soprano saxophone, alto saxophone, flute, percussion
Thomas Buckner – voice

References

2001 albums
Roscoe Mitchell albums